JFB may refer to:

 Jamaica Fire Brigade
 Jewish Women's Association (Germany)
 Journal of Fish Biology
 Henry M. Jackson Federal Building